

Events
February 3 – Opéra-Théâtre de Metz Métropole in Metz, Lorraine, is opened.
June 13 – Composer Maria Teresa Agnesi marries Pier Antonio Pinottini.
September 25 – Antonio Soler becomes organist at El Escorial.
November 3 – George Frideric Handel is operated on for an eye condition, at Guy's Hospital in London.
Christoph Willibald Gluck becomes Konzertmeister at Vienna.
Artist Thomas Gainsborough joins the Ipswich Musical Society; he later paints the portrait of English composer Joseph Gibbs
Nicola Porpora leaves Dresden for Vienna.
Johann Wilhelm Hertel replaces his father, Johann Christian Hertel, as Kapellmeister at the court of Mecklenburg-Strelitz.
Anton Cajetan Adlgasser marries Maria Josepha, daughter of Johann Ernst Eberlin.
Ferdinando Bertoni becomes first organist at St Mark's Basilica in Venice.

Classical music
George Frideric Handel – Jephtha
Johann Adolph Scheibe – Der Tempel des Ruhmes
Georg Philipp Telemann
Concerto à 4, TWV 43:D4
Sonata à 4, TWV 43:F1

Opera
Jean-Baptiste Cardonne – Amaryllis
Christoph Willibald Gluck – La clemenza di Tito, Wq.16
Carl Heinrich Graun 
L'Orfeo, GraunWV B:I:25
Il giudizio di Paride, GraunWV B:I:26
Niccolò Jommelli – I rivali delusi (intermezzo)
Jean-Jacques Rousseau – Le Devin du Village (part of Rousseau's response in the Querelle des Bouffons)

Publications
Filippo Palma – Sei arie con istromenti, Op. 4 (London: John Johnson)
Domenico Scarlatti – 12 Sonatas Modernas para Clavicordio, Libro 1 (London: J. Johnson)
Georg Philipp Telemann – Second Livre de duo pour deux violons, fluttes ou hautbois (Paris: Mr. Blavet, Mme. Boivin, Mr. Le Clerc, Melle. Castagneri), 6 sonatas without bass, TWV 40:124–129

Methods and theory writings

Charles Avison – Essay on Musical Expression
Jean le Rond D'Alembert – Eléments de musique théorique et pratique
Johann Joachim Quantz – Versuch einer Anweisung die Flöte traversiere zu spielen, a treatise on playing the flute
Jean-Philippe Rameau – Nouvelles réflexions de M. Rameau sur sa Démonstration du principe de l'harmonie
Joseph Riepel – Anfangsgründe zur musicalischen Setzkunst

Births

January 24 – Muzio Clementi, composer and pianist (died 1832)
February 11 – Charles Knyvett, singer and arranger (died 1822)
February 12 – Josef Reicha, conductor and composer (died 1795)
March 29 – Edward Jones, composer and harpist (died 1824)
April 4 – Niccolò Antonio Zingarelli, composer (died 1837)
April 5 – Sébastien Érard, piano-maker (died 1831)
May 2 – Ludwig August Lebrun, composer (died 1790)
May 14 – Juliane Reichardt, pianist, singer and composer (died 1783)
May 31 – John Marsh, composer (died 1828) 
September 8 – Carl Stenborg, operatic tenor and composer (died 1813)
September 30 – Justin Heinrich Knecht, organist and composer (died 1817)
October 22 – Ambrogio Minoja, composer (died 1825)
November 25 – Johann Friedrich Reichardt, composer and music critic (died 1814)
November 30 – André da Silva Gomes, Brazilian composer (died 1844)
December 3 – Georg Friedrich Fuchs, composer, clarinetist and music teacher (died 1821)
December 4 – Ange-Étienne-Xavier Poisson de La Chabeaussière, librettist and playwright (died 1820)
date unknown 
Francesco Bianchi, composer and music collector (died 1810)
Leonard McNally, librettist and writer (died 1820)
Abraham Wood, military drummer and composer (died 1804)

Deaths 
January 1 – Shah Abdul Latif Bhittai, Sindhi Sufi scholar, mystic, saint, poet, and musician (born 1689)
March 7 – Pietro Castrucci, violinist and composer (born 1679)
June 19 – Hieronymus Albrecht Hass, harpsichord and clavichord maker
July 20 – Johann Christoph Pepusch, composer (born 1667)
July 24 – Michael Christian Festing, violinist and composer
date unknown – Anton Wilhelm Solnitz, composer (born c.1708)

References

 
18th century in music
Music by year